Karen Nugent (born 29 June 1976) is an Irish former professional tennis player.

Playing for Ireland at the Fed Cup, she has a win–loss record of 20–11.

ITF Circuit finals

Singles: 4 (4 runner-ups)

Doubles: 17 (10 titles, 7 runner-ups)

References

External links
 
 
 

1976 births
Living people
Irish female tennis players
Tennis players from Dublin (city)